Paul Rooney may refer to:

Paul Rooney (artist) (born 1967), British musician and artist
Paul James Rooney (born 1984), British dancer and choreographer
Paul Rooney (footballer) (born 1997), Irish footballer

See also
 Rooney (surname)
 Rooney (disambiguation)